The following is a list of current and former operators of the Embraer E-Jet family:

Civil operators

State and corporate operators 

Brazilian Air Force (Embraer 190/195)

Colombian Air Force (Embraer 190/195)

Ecuadorian Air Force (Embraer 190/195)

Sirte Oil Company (Embraer 170/175) 

Ministry of Defence (2) - leased from LOT Polish Airlines (Embraer 170/175)

Saudi Aramco (Embraer 170/175)

References

External links

ERJ 170 fleet list
ERJ 175 fleet list
ERJ 190 fleet list
ERJ 195 fleet list

E-Jet
Embraer aircraft